Alfie Bates (born 3 May 2001) is an English professional footballer who plays as a midfielder for Brackley Town.

Career
Bates was born in  Coventry and joined the Academy at Coventry City at the age of seven after leaving Coundon Court Juniors. He went on to endure a difficult start to his career, losing his mother to cancer in 2013 and then being released by Birmingham City at the age of 15. He signed for Walsall in March 2017 and scored on his youth-team debut against Morecambe, before featuring in 28 under-18 and six Development Squad matches during the 2017–18 season. He made his first-team debut for the "Saddlers" on 9 October 2018, in a 3–1 victory over Middlesbrough U21 in an EFL Trophy group stage match at the Bescot Stadium.

On 23 February 2022, Bates joined Veikkausliiga club SJK on a long-term deal. In December 2022, he terminated his contract in order to return to England. On 12 January 2023, Bates joined National League North side Brackley Town.

Career statistics

References

2001 births
Living people
Footballers from Coventry
English footballers
Association football midfielders
Coventry City F.C. players
Birmingham City F.C. players
Walsall F.C. players
Seinäjoen Jalkapallokerho players
English Football League players
English expatriate footballers
Expatriate footballers in Finland
English expatriate sportspeople in Finland
Veikkausliiga players
Ykkönen players
SJK Akatemia players
Brackley Town F.C. players